The Empire Theatre (earlier the Queen's Theatre) was a theatre in Longton in Stoke-on-Trent, England. It was later a cinema and a bingo hall; it was destroyed by fire in 1992.

History
The theatre was originally named the Queen's Theatre. The first theatre on the site in Commerce Street, Longton (coordinates ) was opened on 10 September 1888; it was a three-storey building of red sandstone. After extensive alterations in 1890 it seated 1800. It was destroyed by fire on 28 September 1893.

A new theatre, designed by Frank Matcham, was opened on 18 May 1896. It had a richly decorated interior, and seated 2500, in orchestra stalls, dress circle and balcony levels. From 1911 films were also being shown. In 1914 it was renamed the Empire Theatre.

Cinema and bingo hall
It was converted for use as a cinema in 1921; it was subsequently used mostly as a cinema, and staged productions eventually ceased. It later became part of ABC Cinemas. It closed as a cinema in 1966 and was converted into a bingo hall: as the Alpha Bingo Club, later the Tudor Bingo Club; it was later operated by Gala Bingo Clubs. The building was given listed status, Grade II. In 1991 it closed.

A fire, thought to be arson, destroyed most of the building on 31 December 1992. The façade survived, and rebuilding was considered; but it was eventually demolished in 1997.

The Stoke-on-Trent Repertory Theatre Players, who were within a few days of completing the purchase of the building for their new theatre when it burned down, later built the Stoke-on-Trent Repertory Theatre.

References

External links
 "Part of the auditorium of the Empire Theatre in use as a bingo hall, showing the false ceiling and elaborate plasterwork on the circle" at Historic England

Former theatres in England
Theatres completed in 1896
1992 disestablishments in England
Demolished theatres in the United Kingdom
Former cinemas in England
History of Stoke-on-Trent